Xubida panalope is a moth in the family Crambidae. It was described by Harrison Gray Dyar Jr. in 1917. It has been recorded in the US states of  Florida, Georgia, Indiana, Kentucky, Maine, Maryland, Minnesota, North Carolina, Ohio, Oklahoma, South Carolina, Tennessee and Texas.

References

Haimbachiini
Moths described in 1917